Henry M. Moreno (September 17, 1929 – February 2, 2020) was an American trainer and owner of both American Quarter horses and Thoroughbreds.

Background
Moreno grew up on his family's Quarter Horse ranch in southern California. As a young man, he served with the United States Army during the Korean War after which he embarked on a career in horse racing as a trainer of Quarter Horses before switching to Thoroughbreds in 1961. He is best known for his work with female horses and had success with several racemares he imported from South America.

Thoroughbred racing
Henry Moreno won numerous top level stakes in California with different horses. Of them, the Irish-bred racemare Sangue, who won the Prix de Psyché in France at age three, began racing in the United States as a four-year-old in 1982. Under Moreno's care, the daughter of Lyphard won three Grade 1, four Grade 2, and two Grade 3 races in two years of racing.

References

1929 births
2020 deaths
United States Army personnel of the Korean War
American horse trainers
Sportspeople from Corona, California